The 1989–90 Soviet Cup was cup competition of the Soviet Union. The winner of the competition Dynamo Kyiv qualified for the continental tournament.

Participating teams

Source: []
Notes

Competition schedule

First preliminary round
All games took place on May 2, 1989.

Second preliminary round
Games took place on May 9, 1989.

Round of 32
First leg games took place on June 29-30, 1989, while second leg games were scheduled on July 17-18.

Round of 16
First leg games took place on November 8-12, 1989, while most second leg games were played on November 16-18. Three more second leg games were played on March 1, 1990.

Quarter-finals
All games were scheduled on 20 March 1990, while the game between CSKA and Krylya Sovietov Samara was played a day earlier on 19 March.

|}

Semi-finals
Both games took place on 17 April 1990.

|}

Final

External links
 Complete calendar

Soviet Cup seasons
Cup
Cup
Soviet Cup